Zaisan Airport ( / ) is classified as a national aerodrome in the latest AIP.

Airlines and destinations

References

Airports built in the Soviet Union
Airports in Kazakhstan